Brian Arthur Bentley Johnson (28 May 1930 – November 2013) was an English professional footballer who played as a winger. He made appearances in the English Football League for Wrexham

References

1930 births
2013 deaths
English footballers
Association football wingers
Wrexham A.F.C. players
Witton Albion F.C. players
English Football League players